Huntstown and Littlepace is a set of modern housing developments that forms a remote suburb of Dublin city in the county of Fingal in Ireland. It was built in the townlands of Littlepace (westerly) and Huntstown (easterly) which are the southernmost townlands of the civil parish of Mulhuddart. The district is also a parish in the Blanchardstown deanery of the Roman Catholic Archdiocese of Dublin. The nearest villages in the county are Ongar, Mulhuddart and Clonsilla along with Clonee in County Meath.

Location and access 
 Northern border: the River Tolka is the northern boundary of Littlepace while the N3 national route is Huntstown's northern boundary.
 Eastern border: Huntstown borders the community of Blakestown and Blanchardstown to the east. 
 Southern border: Ongar lies to the south of both townlands. 
 Western border: Littlepace is bordered by County Meath to the west.

The district is approximately 14.3 km from Dublin city. It is 4 miles north-west of the M50 motorway. Dublin Bus route 70 connects it to the city centre and Dunboyne. Route 39A connects it to Baggot Street and UCD. Route 270 goes to the Blanchardstown Shopping Centre. Two railways stations are nearby: Clonsilla railway station and Hansfield. Clonsilla train station provides commuter services to and from the city centre going to Pearse and Connolly Station. Trains from Hansfield station travel to Dublin Docks primarily.

History
The area was developed during the housing boom in Ireland. It is located near a major Kepak Meats plant, Facebook Data Centre and Damastown Industrial Estate. Littlepace stud farm is also nearby. Before the area was developed for housing, it was known as a hunting ground, with some estates and a park named in tribute. The Huntstown/Littlepace parish was founded in 1981, and formed from the Blakestown parish, which formed from the parish of Corduff in 1979.

On 1 January 2005, Littlepace was struck by a small tornado, which caused damage to a number of houses and parked vehicles. The damage caused was reported to have cost over 20,000 euros.

Community facilities 
There are two churches of the Roman Catholic Church in the suburb, which constitutes its own parish: 
 Huntstown - "Church of the Sacred Heart of Jesus" (parish separated from Blakestown in 1981)
 Littlepace - "Mary, Mother of Hope" (a Chapel of Ease in the process of development since 2002)

There are also two community centres in the suburb:
 Huntstown - located beside the primary school
 Littlepace - located beside the primary school

There are three parks in the area, Littlepace Park, Hunters Run Park and Hazelbury Park, where both sports clubs play.
There is also a small number of shops in the area located beside the Huntstown community centre. There is a centrashop, beauticians, chemist and an accountant. There is also a shopping centre known as Littlepace shopping centre. This also contains a number of shops, take-aways, restaurants, and a pub.

Sport 
The area has two GAA clubs: Erin go Bragh and Peregrines GAA club. There is also a soccer club called Clonee United. The GAA club moved to the area in 2003 and caters for those interested in playing Gaelic Football, Hurling, Ladies Football and Camogie.  The soccer club was formed through the amalgamation of two clubs, Casta Celtic and Little Pacers F.C., in June 2006.  Casta Celtic had originally formed in 2002 with Little Pacers establishing themselves in 2000. Santos soccer club are also located in the area. A basketball club, the Ongar Chasers, has been recently set up in Phibblestown Community Centre.

Huntstown also has a football club known as Huntstown/Hartstown football club.
Hansfield Football Club was established in 2016. It specialises with more mature players from the ages of 16–30 years.

Education 
There are two primary schools in the suburb:
 Huntstown - "Sacred Heart of Jesus NS"
 Littlepace - "Mary, Mother of Hope NS".

The nearest two secondary schools are in Hartstown & Phibblestown. Hartstown Community School, located in Hartstown is home to over 1,300 students. Coláiste Pobail Setanta is located in nearby Phibblestown; it has over 1000 students and is expected to hold up to 1100 at capacity. It shares a PE hall, the biggest school sports hall in Ireland, with Phibblestown Community Centre. There are two schools within the Phibblestown school campus, Coláiste Pobail Setanta  and Scoil Ghrainne Community National School.

References 

Places in Fingal
Townlands of the barony of Castleknock